Fred J Speakman (born in Essex) was an English naturalist and author. He was one of Britain's best known naturalist-authors in the 1960s.

Life 
Speakman grew up and lived in Epping Forest and became a teacher at Woodside School, Walthamstow. He spent his later years running a field centre at Roseville, High Beach between 1959 and 1979. 
A well known popular writer of illustrated guides to the English forests, in the mid 1950s with the support of Walthamstow's Education Office he began to convert Jubilee Retreat, Chingford into a classroom able to take 20 pupils for day visits to the forest. 

In 1959 he acquired Roseville, High Beach and converted it into a nature study centre. The borough became a pioneer in childhood environmental education, sending primary school children who often lived in working class urban areas on fortnightly visits to be taught by Speakman at Roseville and Ernie Douse and later Ken Hoy at the Jubilee Retreat. As demand for trips to the forest increased, the new London Borough of Waltham Forest purchased the Suntrap Centre in 1967, sending all final year primary classes to make  eight visits a year to the centre.

After retiring he went on to live in Barbados with his second wife Kit and died there in 1982.

Bibliography

References

External links
 Photo of Speakman

People from Epping Forest District
English non-fiction writers
English naturalists
Epping Forest District
1982 deaths
Year of birth missing
English male non-fiction writers